Death Valley  is a horror black comedy mockumentary television series broadcast on MTV. The series premiered on August 29, 2011. The series follows the Undead Task Force (UTF), a newly formed division of the LAPD, as they are filmed by a camera news  crew documentary-style, as they capture the monsters that roam the streets of San Fernando Valley in California. In March, 2012, the show's creator announced that Death Valley had not been picked up for a second season.

Series overview
A year prior to the opening of the series, vampires, werewolves and zombies mysteriously descended upon the streets of California's San Fernando Valley. The newly formed Undead Task Force (UTF), a division of the Los Angeles Police Department, is created to combat the emergence of monsters in the San Fernando Valley. A camera crew  is embedded within the task force to document the zombie, vampire and werewolf encounters. The series has been cancelled by MTV.

Cast
 Bryan Callen as Capt. Frank Dashell 
 Charlie Sanders as Officer Joe Stubeck
 Bryce Johnson as Officer Billy Pierce
 Caity Lotz as Officer Kirsten Landry
 Tania Raymonde as Officer Carla Rinaldi 
 Texas Battle as Officer John "John-John" Johnson

Production
Death Valley was created by Spider One (musician and vocalist of Powerman 5000) years ago, and the series was given a 12-episode order by MTV on September 14, 2010. The series is executive produced by Austin Reading, Eric Weinberg, Julie Kellman Reading, and Tim Healy. Charlie Sanders, Caity Lotz, and Tania Raymonde joined the cast in September, Sanders playing Officer Joe Stubeck, Lotz playing Officer Kirsten Landry, and Raymonde playing Officer Carla Rinaldi. Bryan Callen joined the series in October, as Captain Frank Dashell. The series premiered on August 29, 2011.

Episodes

See also
 "X-Cops," an X-Files episode done in the style of COPS
 List of police television dramas
 List of vampire television series

References

External links

2010s American black comedy television series
2010s American comedy-drama television series
2010s American horror comedy television series
2010s American mockumentary television series
2010s American police comedy television series
2010s American supernatural television series
2011 American television series debuts
2011 American television series endings
American action television series
English-language television shows
MTV original programming
Television about werewolves
Vampires in television
Zombies in television